Kenny Bednarek (born October 14, 1998) is an American track and field sprinter from Rice Lake, Wisconsin. He specializes in the 200-meter distance, having won a silver medal at the 2020 Summer Olympics and at the 2022 World Championships.

Single-day 200/400 feat 
On May 17, 2019, running as a freshman for Indian Hills Community College in Ottumwa, Iowa at the age of 20, he ran the fourth fastest 200 meters of all time, under any conditions, running 19.49 at altitude with an exceptionally strong 6.1 mps aiding wind in the semi-finals of the NJCAA National Championships in Hobbs, New Mexico. The following day, Bednarek proved his speed by running 19.82 into a -0.8 headwind and running a 44.73 400 meters on the same day, becoming the NJCAA national champion in both events. 19.82 displaced Olympic gold medalist Tommie Smith's former world record for the #30 fastest legal race of all time. Six men have run faster into a negative wind, but -0.8 is the strongest hindering wind against any athlete to break 19.95.

Only one other person, Botswanan Isaac Makwala, has ever run sub-20 and sub-45 in the same day. Makwala was 28 when he did that in Madrid on July 6, 2014, making Bednarek the youngest and only American athlete to pull off the feat.

Early life 
Born in Tulsa, Oklahoma, Kenny and his fraternal twin brother, Ian, were adopted by Mary Bednarek and moved to Rice Lake, Wisconsin. Both brothers took to running youth track starting in the second grade. Running for Rice Lake High School, Kenny won seven individual state titles and led his team to a 4×400 relay championship. His 20.43 was the number one high school 200-meter time in the nation in 2018.

He also played football at Rice Lake, scoring 17 touchdowns as a wide receiver, kick returner and on jet sweeps during his junior and senior years, recorded on videos posted on the recruiting website hudl.com. He also starred as a gunner on special teams. During his senior year, his Rice Lake Warriors teams won state championships in both track and football. Bednarek holds Wisconsin all-class records for 200 and 400 meters and the Division 2 record for 100 meters.

Junior College 
He did not qualify academically for a major four-year university so he enrolled at Indian Hills Community College in Ottumwa, Iowa. He said, "I had a goal to go to university after JUCO, but obviously God (had) a different plan."

At Indian Hills, Bednarek ran the fastest indoor 200m in the US, the #2 time in the world for the indoor season, which ranks him tied as the #13 individual on the all time indoor list.

For his achievement, Bednarek was named the "USATF Athlete of the Week" on May 22, 2019.

Professional career 
In July 2019 he left Indian Hills and signed a pro contract with Nike and began training in Florida with former world champion sprinter and Olympic medalist Justin Gatlin. “It wasn’t my decision," he said. "But you know Nike wanted to send me somewhere so I just kind of listened. So you know, they know what they’re doing. It’s all you know just going to trust the process.”

He said that he came out of high school as a 400-meter specialist but transitioned successfully into the 200-meters. "So I kind of want to continue that, maybe in the years to come try to do the 100, but yeah I think the 200 is my main event right now,” he said in July 2019.

At the 2019 USA Outdoor Track and Field Championships, Bednarek qualified for the 200 meters final. In the final, he pulled up with a hamstring injury but jogged across the finish line.  Later in the season, winner Noah Lyles won the 2019 IAAF Diamond League 200m title, entitling him to a wild card to the 2019 World Athletics Championships. USA was thus allowed an additional entry. By virtue of Bednarek being the fourth person to cross the finish line at the National Championships with a qualifying time, he was given the position into the World Championships.  Weeks after his injury, Bednarek was only able to muster a non-qualifying 21.50 in his heat due to a nerve flare up.

On August 10, 2020, in the COVID-19 abbreviated season, Bednarek ran a world leading 19.80 +1.0 at the Star Athletics Sprint Showcase in Montverde, Florida. The time moved him up to a tie for the #25 mark of all time.

On August 4, 2021, Bednarek won the silver medal at the 2020 Tokyo Olympics in the 200-meter men's final with a time of 19.68 seconds. 
On Sept. 9, 2021, Bednarek clinched the Diamond League 200 meter season championship at the Weltklasse Meet in Zürich, winning with a time of 19.70. 
During 2021, Bednarek ran the most sub-20 performances over 200 meters, both for wind-legal conditions and all conditions, of any athlete in a single season, with 12 total sub-20 performances, of which 10 were wind-legal. He ended the season ranked No. 1 in the 200 meters by World Athletics.

On July 21, 2022 in Eugene, Ore., Bednarek took silver in the 200 meters at the World Athletics  Championships with a time of 19.77. Noah Lyles, whom he had defeated in Tokyo, set an American record of 19.31 in the race.

Personal life 
His nickname is Kung Fu Kenny because he wears a Rambo-like tie around his head in races. 
He also has a pet Husky named Rambo.
He is Catholic.

Statistics
Information from World Athletics profile.

Personal bests

Major competitions

Circuit wins
Diamond League (200 m)
2021: Gateshead, Doha, Zürich

References

External links
 
 
 

Living people
1998 births
American male sprinters
African-American male track and field athletes
American twins
Sportspeople from Tulsa, Oklahoma
Track and field athletes from Oklahoma
People from Rice Lake, Wisconsin
Track and field athletes from Wisconsin
African-American Catholics
Athletes (track and field) at the 2020 Summer Olympics
Medalists at the 2020 Summer Olympics
Olympic silver medalists for the United States in track and field
Diamond League winners
21st-century African-American sportspeople